Vanessa Kay Trump (née Pergolizzi, later Haydon; born December 18, 1977) is an American former model. She married Donald Trump Jr. in 2005 and they divorced in 2018. She was born in New York City.

Early life 
She grew up in a townhouse on the Upper East Side of Manhattan and attended The Dwight School, a private school. Charles Haydon, her stepfather, (who some news articles refer to as her father) was a lawyer whose clients included Marilyn Monroe and Broadway producer and real estate mogul Abe Hirschfeld. Her mother, Bonnie Kay Haydon, ran Kay Models, a modeling agency, and is of Danish origin. Her maternal grandfather was Danish jazz musician Kai Ewans.

Career 
She was a model in her teens and twenties and was signed to Wilhelmina Models.

As an actress, she appeared in a scene of the 2003 film Something's Gotta Give. She also appeared in a 2011 episode of The Apprentice (hosted by her father-in-law, Donald Trump) and Bret Michaels: Life as I Know It (2010).

She and her sister Veronika opened a nightclub called 'Sessa' in the fall of 2003.

She also released her own line of handbags called La Poshett, from 2010 to 2013.

Personal life 

In 1998, she was linked with American actor Leonardo DiCaprio. From 1998 to 2001, she dated Saudi prince Khalid bin Bandar bin Sultan Al Saud. The relationship ended following the September 11 attacks when Khalid bin Bandar left the U.S. after his Saudi ambassador father, Bandar bin Sultan Al Saud, was suspected of having indirect ties to the Al Qaeda hijackers.

Vanessa married Donald Trump Jr. on November 12, 2005. The wedding was held at the Mar-a-Lago club in Florida; the service was officiated by Trump Jr.'s aunt, Judge Maryanne Trump Barry. Trump Jr. proposed to her with a $100,000 ring which he received as a gift from a jeweler in exchange for proposing to her in front of paparazzi outside of the jeweler's store in a New Jersey mall. Together they have five children: daughter Kai Madison (b. May 2007), son Donald John III (b. February 2009), son Tristan Milos (b. October 2011), son Spencer Frederick (b. October 2012), and daughter Chloe Sophia (b. June 2014). The oldest daughter, Kai, is named after Trump's grandfather (Kai's great-grandfather), Kai Ewans.

On March 15, 2018, it was reported that Vanessa filed for an uncontested divorce in New York; however, it was later revealed that the divorce was contested. In July 2018, they resolved a child custody issue, and the divorce was settled at the end of 2018.

References

External links 
 

1977 births
Living people
Vanessa
American fashion designers
American socialites
Marymount Manhattan College alumni
American people of Danish descent